1152 Pawona, provisional designation , is a stony Vestian asteroid from the inner regions of the asteroid belt, approximately 16 kilometers in diameter. Discovered by Karl Reinmuth at Heidelberg Observatory in 1930, the asteroid was named in honor of astronomers Johann Palisa and Max Wolf.

Discovery 

Pawona was discovered on 8 January 1930, by German astronomer Karl Reinmuth at the Heidelberg-Königstuhl State Observatory in southwest Germany. It was independently discovered by Italian astronomer Luigi Volta at the Observatory of Turin on 19 January 1930, and by Grigory Neujmin at the Simeiz Observatory on the Crimean peninsula on 21 January 1930. The Minor Planet Center, however, only acknowledges the first discoverer.

Orbit and classification 

Pawona is a supposed member of the stony Vesta family, named after 4 Vesta and the main belt's second-largest asteroid family by number. It orbits the Sun in the inner main-belt at a distance of 2.3–2.5 AU once every 3 years and 9 months (1,381 days). Its orbit has an eccentricity of 0.04 and an inclination of 5° with respect to the ecliptic.

Physical characteristics 

In the SMASS classification, Pawona is an Sl-subtype, that transitions from the common stony S-type to the rare L-type asteroids.

Rotation period 

Several rotational lightcurves of Pawona have been obtained from photometric observations since 2002. Analysis of these lightcurves gave a well-defined rotation period between 3.415 and 3.425 hours with a brightness amplitude of 0.16 to 0.26 magnitude.

Diameter and albedo 

According to the surveys carried out by the Infrared Astronomical Satellite IRAS, the Japanese Akari satellite and the NEOWISE mission of NASA's Wide-field Infrared Survey Explorer, Pawona measures between 15.69 and 18.826 kilometers in diameter and its surface has an albedo between 0.1529 and 0.2167.

The Collaborative Asteroid Lightcurve Link derives an albedo of 0.2782 and a diameter of 15.90 kilometers based on an absolute magnitude of 11.0.

Naming 

This minor planet was named after astronomers Johann Palisa and Max Wolf, two prolific discoverers of minor planets, in recognition of their cooperation. The name was proposed by Swedish astronomer Bror Ansgar Asplind. The official naming citation was mentioned in The Names of the Minor Planets by Paul Herget in 1955.

Feminization of names 

Pawona is a combination of "Palisa" and "Wolf" (Pa, Wo) joined with a Latin feminine suffix. The custom of adding the female endings  "a" or "ia" to male names had only faded out by World War II and was finally abolished in 1947, when the Minor Planet Center took over responsibility of numbering and naming asteroids.

Notes

References

External links 
 Asteroid Lightcurve Database (LCDB), query form (info )
 Dictionary of Minor Planet Names, Google books
 Asteroids and comets rotation curves, CdR – Observatoire de Genève, Raoul Behrend
 Discovery Circumstances: Numbered Minor Planets (1)-(5000) – Minor Planet Center
 
 

001152
Discoveries by Karl Wilhelm Reinmuth
Named minor planets
001152
19300108